B-Thong was a Swedish groove metal band from Gothenburg that was formed in 1990 and disbanded in 1998.

The band was formed under the name Concrete Stuff but changed their name to B-Thong in 1993. They released three studio albums, as well as one compilation album. The band's latest label was Mascot Records.

Members

Final lineup 
 Ralf "Ralph Lennart" Gyllenhammar – lead vocalist
 Stefan Thuresson – lead guitarist
 Lars "Honcho" Häglund – bassist
 Morgan "Lawbreaker" Pettersson – drummer

Former members 
 Tony Jelencovich – lead vocalist
 Staffan Johansson – drummer

Discography 
Studio albums
 Skinned (1994)
 Damage (1995)
 From Strength to Strength (1997)

Compilation album
 The Concrete Collection (2000)

References 

Groove metal musical groups
Swedish heavy metal musical groups